Rob Casserley is a surgeon and mountaineer who has reached the peak of Mount Everest eight times. He appeared in the BBC documentary Everest ER.

Casserley was the first Westerner to twice double-summit Everest in one week. He was a guide on Everest in 2015 during the 2015 Mount Everest avalanches. During his 2015 expedition, an earthquake hit Nepal causing an avalanche at Everest base camp, which his team survived. Prior to that, he had reached the summit eight times.

References 

Year of birth missing (living people)
Living people
British summiters of Mount Everest
21st-century British medical doctors